Jacquelyn Taylor (née Long) is an American nurse-scientist and Professor of Nursing and Director of the Center for Research on People of Color at Columbia University School of Nursing. Her research focuses on health disparities in underrepresented minority populations. Her work combines approaches in omics, such as genomics, epigenomics and whole genome sequencing, with an understanding of underlying social factors that contribute to health outcomes. In 2019, she was elected to the National Academy of Medicine in recognition of her work.

Education 
Taylor is African-American. She attended Wayne State University in Detroit, Michigan for both her undergraduate and graduate studies. There, she received her Bachelor of Science in Nursing in 1999, her Master of Science in Nursing in 2002, and her Doctor of Philosophy in 2004. She first joined a laboratory during her undergraduate studies, working under the mentorship of Joseph Dunbar, who was the chair of the department of physiology. Her research at the university evolved over the years to ultimately studying the genetics of hypertension, focusing on multiple generations of African American women .

Career and research 
In 2005, Taylor became an Assistant Professor of Nursing at the University of Michigan. In 2008, she moved to Connecticut, where she became Associate Professor and Associate Dean of Diversity and Inclusion at Yale School of Nursing. While at Yale, she was Contact PI on a five-year study, receiving funding support from the National Institute of Nursing Research at the National Institutes of Health. The study, known as the Intergenerational Impact of Genetic and Psychological Factors on Blood Pressure (InterGEN) study, investigated the combined impact of genetic, environmental, and psychological stressors on blood pressure, with a focus on members of the African American community.

During her tenure, she also began to study the genomics of lead poisoning in response to the ongoing Flint water crisis, developing a method to simultaneously measure lead levels and test genotypes of children to identify genetic factors that increased risk of long-term damage. As a graduate student at Wayne State, she also investigated the interplay between gene variants and environmental exposure to lead among children in Detroit. She identified a correlation between children with a variant of the gene that codes for arylsulfatase A (ASA) and an increased risk of neurodevelopmental damage as a result of exposure to lead.

In 2018, Taylor joined the faculty at New York University, becoming the inaugural Vernice D. Ferguson Professor in Health Equity where she remained until 2020. There, she served as the co-Principal Investigator on a five-year grant award, which established the NYU Meyers Center for Precision Health in Diverse Populations. The center would train nurse scientists to study chronic conditions and their underlying biology, with the goal of reducing their burden on marginalized communities. In 2020, she became the Helen F. Petit Professor of Nursing, Founder and Executive Director for the Center for Research on People of Color at Columbia University School of Nursing.

Throughout her career, Taylor has also been an advocate for improving precision health in minority populations — with a focus on health equity, social determinants of health, and cardiovascular genomics .

Awards and honors 

 Elected Fellow, American Academy of Nursing, 2011
 Elected Fellow, American Heart Association, 2015
 Presidential Early Career Award for Scientists and Engineers, 2017
 Elected Member, National Academy of Medicine, 2019

Select publications

References 

Wayne State University alumni
American nurses
American women nurses
1970s births
Members of the National Academy of Medicine
Yale University faculty
Columbia University School of Nursing faculty
New York University faculty
Living people
American women academics
21st-century American women
African-American nurses